The Koalisyon ng Katapatan at Karanasan sa Kinabukasan (K4, Coalition of Truth and Experience for Tomorrow) is the political multi-party electoral alliance that supported president Gloria Macapagal Arroyo, who won 2004 Philippine presidential election. It is the remnant of the People Power Coalition that was formed following the ascendancy of President Gloria Macapagal Arroyo to power. Arroyo is seeking a complete term under this coalition with Sen. Noli de Castro, an independent, yet popular, politician, as her running mate.

The leading party in this coalition is the ruling Lakas-Christian Muslim Democrats (Lakas-CMD), of which Arroyo is a member. Other parties under this coalition are the Liberal Party, the Nationalist People's Coalition, the Nacionalista Party, the Partido Demokratiko Sosyalista ng Pilipinas and the People's Reform Party as well as the Kabalikat ng Mamamayang Pilipino.

K-4 Senatorial Slate

Election results
7 out of 12 candidates won the possible 12 seats in the Senate namely: (in order of votes received)
 Rodolfo Biazon
 Pia Cayetano
 Dick Gordon
 Lito Lapid
 Mar Roxas
 Bong Revilla
 Miriam Defensor Santiago

See also
Koalisyon ng Nagkakaisang Pilipino (Coalition of United Filipinos), the K4's rival coalition in the 2004 national elections.
 People Power Coalition, the name of pro-Arroyo coalition in the 2001 midterm elections.
 Lakas 1998 Senatorial Slate, the pro-administration senatorial slate in the 1998 national elections.
 Lakas-Laban Coalition, the name of the pro-Ramos coalition in the 1995 midterm elections.

Defunct political party alliances in the Philippines